Ti'a James Senio Peau (3 February 1966 – 13 February 2020), known professionally as Jimmy Thunder, was a Samoan-born New Zealand professional boxer who held the IBO heavyweight title from 1994 to 1995. He held multiple regional heavyweight titles, including the OPBF title from 1989 to 1991 and the Australian title twice between 1992 and 1994.

Early life 
During his early life and amateur career, Thunder was known as Jimmy Peau. His mother is from the village of Fasitoouta, and his father is from the village of Falelatai. Thunder was born third out of six siblings. While born in Apia, he grew up in Auckland, New Zealand.

He went to school at Onehunga High School in Auckland. His friend introduced Thunder to Gerry Preston. Preston took on the young Samoan into his boxing gym in Mangere Bridge. In his early amateur days, Thunder became the first Samoan-born fighter to win a gold medal in the heavyweight division, representing New Zealand at the 1986 Commonwealth Games in Edinburgh, Scotland. He defeated Dougie Young in his hometown by unanimous decision. It was one of the nine gold medals won for New Zealand in that year. As an amateur he had 89 fights, finishing his amateur career with 83-6 record.

Career
Thunder turned pro in 1988, after being omitted from New Zealand's Seoul Olympic Games team. He changed his surname from Peau to Thunder in 1989 at the suggestion of his manager at the time, Jack Rennie. Later in his professional career he also fought under the name James Thunder. Among his notable victories are wins over Tony Tubbs, Craig Peterson, Trevor Berbick, and Tim Witherspoon. On the 18 March 1997 edition of the USA Network's Tuesday Night Fights he knocked out Crawford Grimsley with his first punch, scoring the fastest knockout in history at 13 seconds, including the count of 10, which was not even begun, so it lasted 3 seconds, during the quick walk from his corner to the ring centre, immediately throwing the first and only punch with his last step. He finished his 49 fight career with 35 victories, 28 by knockout. Throughout his career he won regional titles including the Australian Heavyweight Champion twice as well as winning the lesser IBO and WBF Heavyweight titles.

Professional boxing record

Personal life
Peau married his second wife, Iris White magpie, a Native American in 2008. The two met in 2006 and got married at Whitemagpie's reservation in Arizona in a cultural ceremony. He had three children in New Zealand, from his first marriage. His eldest son, Louis, was selected for the Samoa national rugby league team to play an Australian selection side in 2010.

After retirement in 2003, it was reported Peau was in financial debt. The Sunday Star-Times discovered he had been living homeless on the streets of Las Vegas in Sunset Park. World Boxing Hall of Fame inductee, Thell Torrance reported Peau would ask for handouts and turn up to boxing gyms, offering himself for sparring work and was often turned down due to poor conditioning. It was later revealed by close family he was given casual laboring work in a rehab center run by Native Americans and became a personal trainer and part-time bodyguard.

Peau was arrested and charged for battery and substantial bodily harm after an altercation at a Las Vegas street party. He was released from the Southern Desert Correctional Center, north of Las Vegas, to US immigration, after his case was considered by an Immigration Court, seeing Peau in threat of being deported to New Zealand. Peau also had previous immigration issues, after being held by US immigration authorities three years prior until Whitemagpie paid a bond for his release after it was discovered he did not hold a US green card.

Peau died in his sleep in Auckland on 13 February 2020, following brain surgery.

References

External links 
 
 
 BoxingRecords

1966 births
2020 deaths
Samoan male boxers
Boxers at the 1986 Commonwealth Games
Commonwealth Games gold medallists for New Zealand
Sportspeople from Apia
International Boxing Organization champions
New Zealand male boxers
Commonwealth Games medallists in boxing
Heavyweight boxers
Samoan emigrants to New Zealand
People educated at Onehunga High School
People charged with battery
New Zealand world boxing champions
Medallists at the 1986 Commonwealth Games